Cratippus can refer to:
 Cratippus of Athens, a 4th-century BC historian
 Cratippus of Pergamon, a 1st-century BC philosopher